Wurrwurrwuy stone arrangements is a heritage-listed indigenous site at Yirrkala, Northern Territory, Australia. It is also known as Wurrwurrwuy. It was added to the Northern Territory Heritage Register on 15 August 2007 and to the 
Australian National Heritage List on 9 August 2013.

History 
During his epic circumnavigation of Australia in 1802-1803 Matthew Flinders found bamboo frameworks, lines of stone fireplaces, pieces of cloth and the stumps of trees cut down with metal axes, at a number of places along the coast of the Gulf of Carpentaria. He interpreted this as evidence of Chinese visits to this part of Australia. On 16 February 1803, he met a fleet of Macassan praus anchored in the waters off the English Company Islands group. It was here that he learnt from Pobassoo, the captain of the fleet, that Macassan praus came to the coast of northern Australia every year on the north-west monsoon winds to collect and dry trepang or bêche de mer which they then sold to the Chinese.

Interactions between Aboriginal people and Macassans 

Flinders' encounter with Pobassoo is the first Australian record of the north Australian trepang industry. Macassans had probably started to visit the northern Australian coast before 1650 but Dutch East India Company documents suggest that the intensive catching and processing of trepang for the Chinese market probably began in about 1750. Macassan involvement in the industry ended in 1906 when the South Australian Government, which administered the Northern Territory at that time, restricted the issuing of licenses to locally-owned vessels.

The distribution of tamarind trees (an exotic species), trepang processing sites and the depiction of Macassan praus and other items of Macassan material culture in rock art provide direct material evidence for the Macassan trepang industry. Trepang processing sites are found on the Kimberley coast and on the Arnhem Land and Groote Eylandt coasts. While depictions of praus and items of Macassan material culture are not unusual in the rock art of Arnhem Land and offshore islands like Groote Eylandt, Chasm Island and Bickerton Island, such images are rare in the Kimberley. These data and Aboriginal oral tradition suggest that the relationship between Macassans and Aborigines in the Kimberley was different to the relationship between Macassans and Yolngu with the former relationship characterised by hostility.

Aboriginal people in Arnhem adopted a number of items of Macassan material culture including dugout canoes and iron. This transformed Aboriginal economies so they had an increased marine focus. This is shown by the large numbers of dugong and turtle bones in middens on the Coburg Peninsula that date from the time of the Macassan trepang industry and an increased marine focus on Groote Eylandt. There is also evidence for changes in the way Aboriginal people used space and evidence for changes in their exchange networks.

Aboriginal people living in Arnhem Land incorporated the memory of Macassans into their social and cultural life. For example, Macassans and their voyages are important in some ceremonies and song cycles where songs may reference Muslim prayers. Oral tradition also provides accounts of Aboriginal people working for Macassans on trepang sites and undertaking voyages on praus to the Celebes and further afield. The close relationship between Macassans and Aborigines is reflected in the large number of Macassan borrowed words found in Aboriginal languages in Arnhem Land and on Groote Eylandt which includes words for different parts of praus and the rigging on these vessels. Aboriginal people in these areas use the Macassan names for some parts of praus and their rigging that are depicted in rock art.

The stone pictures at Wurrwurrwuy 

The stone pictures at Wurrwurrwuy are part of the story of Macassan Aboriginal interactions in Arnhem Land. They lie within the territory of the Lamomirri clan but on the death of the last responsible Lamomirri man they were taken into the custody of the Gumatj clan. A father and son, Yumbul and Dhatalamirri, created the pictures, probably in the second half of the nineteenth century. Oral histories recorded in 1967 indicate that Yumbul, possibly with the aid of some of his fellow clansmen, made the first pictures. The site was entrusted to his second son, Dhatalamirri, who added further pictures at a later date.

The stone pictures created by Yumbul and Dhatalamirri depict Macassan praus, canoes, houses with multiple rooms, fireplaces where trepang were boiled, trepang drying houses, a house for storing wood, and stones for sharpening iron knives. There are also pictures of an Aboriginal fish trap and Aboriginal dwellings that may not have been made by the father and son.

When Macknight and Grey recorded the site in 1967, two Aboriginal informants, Munggurrawuy (a Gumatj custodian) and Mawalan (a relative of Yumbul and Dhatalamirri), were able to explain how the divisions within the pictures of the praus represented different parts of the vessel: the crews' quarters, the galley, the eating space, the store and the water tank. They also provided Macassan names for the different parts of praus, the rudder, bowsprit and the tripod mast with its sail and rigging. These pictures show that Yolngu visited trepang sites and spent enough time on praus to learn the various parts of the vessels and where the crew lived and ate. This is consistent with historical records showing that Aboriginal people travelled in praus to the Celebes, a trip that was made by Munggurrawuy's father. The custodians told Macknight and Gray that Wurrwurrwuy was a legacy from the past with no sacred associations. They felt that it was useful as it provided younger men with some idea of the way of life of Macassans who had come to the area to collect trepang. The pictures are a permanent reminder of Yolngu knowledge about this past.

Description 

Wurrwurrwuy stone arrangements is at about 1.41ha, 10 km south east of Yirrkala, being those parts of Northern Territory Portions 1044 and 1692 designated Northern Territory Portion 6647(A).

The stone pictures at Wurrwurrwuy that depict aspects of the Macassan trepang industry lie on an open rocky shelf about ten kilometres south east of Yirrkala in Eastern Arnhem Land, Northern Territory. The area is bounded to the north by a small creek: on the west by a strip of dense coastal vine thicket and to the east and south by the sea. The vegetation on the shelf is low grass and stunted shrubs.

The stone pictures cover an area of about 80 metres by 70 metres. They are divided into three groups with a few outlying features. The group of pictures at the southern end of the site mainly depicts Macassan subjects in simple outlines. The northern group also depicts Macassan subjects, but the style is different, with stones of different sizes used to give weight to parts of the pictures. The western group comprises a mixture of Macassan and Aboriginal subjects.

Condition 

When first recorded in the 1960s there was some minor damage to the site from buffalo mainly at the southern end, but there has been no evidence for subsequent deterioration. The site has been fenced and paths and interpretive signs have been installed. The place is maintained by Dhimurru Corporation Aboriginal Rangers.

The stone pictures at Wurrwurrwuy are nationally significant as a rare example of stones arranged to depict secular subjects rather than the arranged stones being associated with ceremony and the sacred. The stone pictures depict a range of subjects including Aboriginal camps, fish traps and images relating to the Macassan trepang industry including praus, canoes, the stone fireplaces where trepang were boiled and Macassan houses. The depictions of praus at Wurrwurrwuy show the internal arrangements of the vessels, which is rare in Aboriginal depictions of praus in any medium. The creators of the stone pictures would have acquired their knowledge of the internal arrangement of praus during visits to, or voyages on, such vessels.

Wurrwurrwuy stone arrangements was listed on the Australian National Heritage List on 9 August 2013 having satisfied the following criteria.

Criterion B: Rarity

The stone pictures at Wurrwurrwuy have outstanding heritage value to the nation as a rare example of stones arranged to depict utilitarian and secular objects rather than the arranged stones being associated with ceremony and the sacred. It is also a place with rare depictions of the internal arrangements in praus. This is knowledge that the creators would have acquired either during visits to or voyages on such vessels.

References

Bibliography 
 Australian Heritage Council 2010. West Kimberley Place Report. Downloaded on 14 June 2012 from http://www.environment.gov.au/heritage/places/national/west-kimberley/pubs/ahc-final-assessment-full.pdf.
 Berndt R. and Berndt C. 1954. Arnhem land, its history and its people. Melbourne: F.W. Cheshire.
 Bowdler S. 2005. 'Movement, exchange and the ritual life in south-eastern Australia'. In Macfarlane I. and M-J. Mountain and R. Paton (eds.) Many Exchanges: archaeology. history. community and the work of Isabel McBryde. Aboriginal History Monograph II. pp. 131–146.
 Campbell T.D. and Hossfeld P.S. 1966. 'Australian Aboriginal stone arrangements in north west New South Wales'. Transactions of the Royal Society of South Australia 90: 171-176.
 Clarke A. 2000a. 'Time, tradition and transformation: the negotiation of cross-cultural engagements in Groote Eylandt, northern Australia'. In Torrence R. and Clarke A. (eds.) The archaeology of difference: negotiating cross cultural engagement in Oceania. London: Routledge. pp. 142–177.
 Clarke A. 2000b. 'The 'Moormans Trowsers': Macassan and Aboriginal interactions and the changing fabric of Indigenous social life'. In O'Connor S. and Veth P. (eds.) East of the Wallace Line: studies of past and present maritime cultures of the Indo-Pacific region. Rotterdam: AA Balkema. pp. 315–335.
 Clarke A. and Frederick U. 2006. 'Closing the distance: interpreting cross-cultural engagements through Indigenous rock art'. In Lilley I. (ed.), Archaeology of Oceania: Australia and the Pacific Islands. Oxford: Blackwell Publishing. pp. 116–133.
 Crawford I.M. 1968. The art of the Wandjina: Aboriginal cave paintings in Kimberley, Western Australia. London: Oxford University Press.
 Crawford I.M. 2001. We won the victory: Aborigines and outsiders on the north-west coast of the Kimberley. Fremantle: Fremantle Arts Centre Press.
 Dhimurru Aboriginal Corporation 1999. Documentation of Heritage Values - Nanydjaka. Canberra: Unpublished report to the Australian Heritage Commission.
 Flinders M. 1814. A Voyage to Terra Australis: Volume 2. Downloaded on 15 June 2012 from http://freeread.com.au/ebooks/e00050.html#chapter2-8.
 Macknight C.C. 1972. 'Macassans and Aborigines'. Oceania 42: 283-321.
 Macknight C. C. 1976. The Voyage to Marege: Macassan trepangers in northern Australia. Melbourne: Melbourne University Press.
 Macknight C.C. 1986. 'Macassans in the Aboriginal past'. Archaeology in Oceania 21: 69-75.
 Macknight C.C. 2011. 'The view from Marege: Australian knowledge of Makassar and the impact of the trepang industry across two centuries'. Aboriginal History 35: 121-143.
 Macknight C.C. and Gray W.J. 1970. Aboriginal stone pictures in Arnhem Land. Canberra: Australian Institute of Aboriginal Studies.
 McCarthy F.D. 1940. 'Aboriginal stone arrangements in Australia'. The Australian Museum Magazine 7(6): 184-189.
 McCarthy F. D., 1953a. 'A circumcision ceremony and stone arrangement on Groote Eylandt'. Records of the Australian Museum 23: 97-103.
 McCarthy F. D., 1953b. 'The snake-woman Jiningbirna'. Records of the Australian Museum 23: 105-110.
 McCarthy F. 1960. 'The cave paintings of Groote Eylandt and Chasm Island'. In Mountford, C. (ed.) The Australian American expedition to Arnhem Land: Vol. 2 anthropology and nutrition. Melbourne: Melbourne University Press.
 MacIntyre-Tamwoy S. and Harrison R. 2004. 'Monuments to colonialism? stone arrangements, tourist cairns and turtle magic at Evans Bay, Cape York'. Australian Archaeology 59: 31- 42
 Massola A. 1968. 'Native stone arrangement at Carisbrook'. Victorian Naturalist 80: 177-180.
 May S., Taçon P., Wesley D. and Travers M. 2010. 'Painting history: Indigenous observation and depictions of the 'other' in northwestern Arnhem Land, Australia'. Australian Archaeology 71: 57-65.
 Mitchell S. 1996. 'Dugongs and dugouts, sharptacks and shellbacks: Macassan contact and Aboriginal marine hunting on the Coburg Peninsula, north western Arnhem Land'. Indo-Pacific Prehistory Association Bulletin 15: 181-191.
 Mitchell S. 2000. 'Guns or barter? Indigenous exchange networks and the mediation of conflict in post-contact western Arnhem Land'. In Torrence R. and Clarke A. (eds.) The archaeology of difference: negotiating cross cultural engagement in Oceania. London: Routledge. pp. 182–214.
 Morwood M. and Hobbs D. 1997. 'The Asian connection: Preliminary report on Indonesian trepang sites on the Kimberley coast, NW Australia'. Archaeology in Oceania 32, pp. 197–206.
 O'Connor S. and Arrow S. 2008. 'Boat images in the rock art of northern Australia with particular reference to the Kimberley, Western Australia'. In Clark G., Leach F. and O'Connor S. (eds.) Islands of inquiry: colonisation, seafaring and the archaeology of maritime landscapes. Canberra: ANU ePress. pp. 397–409.
 Ross A. 2008. 'Managing meaning at an ancient site in the 21st Century: the Gummingurru Aboriginal stone arrangement on the Darling Downs, Southern Queensland'. Oceania 78: 91-108.
 Rowlands R.J. and Rowlands M.R. 1966. 'Aboriginal stone arrangements in the Western Desert of Australia'. Mankind: 6: 335-369.
 Rowlands R.J. and Rowlands M.R. 1985. 'Aboriginal stone arrangements; report on field work in western New South Wales, western Queensland and north-eastern south Australia'. Canberra: Unpublished report for Australian Institute of Aboriginal Studies.
 Russell D. 2004. 'Aboriginal-Makassan interactions in the eighteenth and nineteenth centuries in northern Australia and contemporary sea rights claims'. Australian Aboriginal Studies 1: 1-17.
 Stockton J. and Rodgers R. 1979. 'Aboriginal stone arrangements in Tasmania'. The Artefact 4 (3-4): 1-13.
 Taçon P.S., May S.K., Fallon S.J., Travers M., Daryl Wesley D. and Lamilami R. 2010. 'A minimum age for the depiction of Southeast Asian praus in the rock art of Arnhem Land, Northern Territory'. Australian Archaeology 71: 1-10.
 Turner D. 1973. 'The rock art of Bickerton Island in comparative perspective'. Oceania: 43: 286-325.
 Turner D. 1974. Tradition and Transformation: A study of Aborigines in the Groote Eylandt area, northern Australia. Canberra: Australian Institute of Aboriginal Studies.
 Thompson D.F. 1949. Economic Structure and the Ceremonial Exchange Cycle in Arnhem Land. Melbourne: MacMillan.
 Warner W.I. 1932. Malay influence on Aboriginal cultures of north-eastern Arnhem Land. Oceania 2: 476-495.

Attribution

External links

Australian National Heritage List
Yirrkala, Northern Territory
Indigenous Australian culture
Articles incorporating text from the Australian Heritage Database
Northern Territory Heritage Register